"Here I Am" is a song written and recorded by American singer-songwriter Dolly Parton. The song was included on her 1971 album Coat of Many Colors. It was recorded on April 27, 1971, at RCA Studio B in Nashville, Tennessee, and produced by Bob Ferguson.

Personnel
Adapted from the album liner notes and RCA recording session records.

David Briggs – piano
Jerry Carrigan – drums
Pete Drake – steel
Bobby Dyson – bass
Bob Ferguson – producer
Johnny Gimble – fiddle
Dave Kirby – guitar
George McCormick – guitar
Mack Magaha – fiddle
The Nashville Edition – background vocals
Dolly Parton – lead vocals, writer
Hargus Robbins – piano
Billy Sanford – guitar
Jerry Shook – guitar
Buddy Spicher – fiddle
Buck Trent – electric banjo

2018 version

In 2018 Parton re-recorded the song as a duet with Australian singer-songwriter Sia for the soundtrack to the 2018 Netflix film, Dumplin'. It was produced by Linda Perry and released as the first single from the soundtrack on September 14, 2018.

Critical reception
Upon its release the single received positive reviews from music critics. Writing for Rolling Stone, Althea Legaspi said Parton and Sia's "voices meld together, giving it a hymnal quality, buoyed by gospel-styled choir backing vocals." In a review for NPR Lars Gotrich noted the song's slower tempo compared to the original 1971 recording, calling the single "a gospel-infused statement of purpose."

Commercial performance
The single sold 10,000 copies during its first week of release. It debuted and peaked at No. 37 on the US Billboard Hot Country Songs chart.

Music video
The music video for the song was released on November 2, 2018. Neither Parton nor Sia appear in the video which follows a mourner visiting a grave, a homeless man begging for change, a child cowering in fear as her mother is abused, and an elderly woman sick in bed. It focuses on the evolution of the characters introduced at the beginning, and leaves viewers with an uplifting message of hope.

Personnel
Adapted from the album liner notes.

Chris Allgood – mastering assistant
David Angell – violin
Sean Badum – string recording assistant
Avery Bright – viola
Billy Bush – mixing
David Davidson – violin
Luke Edgemon – background vocals
Damon Fox – piano, B3 organ, electric guitar
Luis Flores – assistant engineer
David Goldstein – drums
Austin Hoke – cello, string arrangements
Emily Lazar – mastering
Briana Lee – background vocals
John McBride – string recording
Billy Mohler – bass
Emily Nelson – cello
Dolly Parton – lead vocals
Linda Perry – producer, engineer
Eli Pearl – electric guitar, acoustic guitar
Sia – lead vocals
Maiya Skykes – background vocals
Katelyn Westergard – violin
Kristin Weber – violin
Kristin Wilkinson – viola

Charts

References

Dolly Parton songs
Songs written by Dolly Parton
1971 songs